Chula Vista is a census-designated place (CDP) in Zavala County, Texas, United States. The population was 450 at the 2010 census. Prior to the 2010 census, the CDP was known as Chula Vista-River Spur.

Geography
Chula Vista is located at  (28.659561, -99.806840).

According to the United States Census Bureau, the CDP has a total area of 0.5 square miles (1.4 km2), all of it land.

Demographics
As of the census of 2000, there were 400 people, 105 households, and 89 families residing in the CDP. The population density was 733.3 people per square mile (280.8/km2). The 120 housing units averaged 220.0/sq mi (84.2/km2). The racial makeup of the CDP was 65.50% White, 3.00% Native American, 29.00% from other races, and 2.50% from two or more races. Hispanics or Latinos of any race were 78.25% of the population.

Of the 105 households, 54.3% had children under the age of 18 living with them, 63.8% were married couples living together, 13.3% had a female householder with no husband present, and 14.3% were not families. About 11.4% of all households were made up of individuals, and 2.9% had someone living alone who was 65 years of age or older. The average household size was 3.81 and the average family size was 4.17.

In the CDP, the population was distributed as 38.8% under the age of 18, 9.5% from 18 to 24, 27.0% from 25 to 44, 20.8% from 45 to 64, and 4.0% who were 65 years of age or older. The median age was 27 years. For every 100 females, there were 91.4 males. For every 100 females age 18 and over, there were 99.2 males.

The median income for a household was $18,438, and for a family was $25,764. Males had a median income of $40,000 versus $13,523 for females. The per capita income for the CDP was $7,283. About 34.6% of families and 35.9% of the population were below the poverty line, including 30.2% of those under age 18 and 53.3% of those age 65 or over.

Education
Chula Vista is served by the Crystal City Independent School District.

References

Census-designated places in Texas
Census-designated places in Zavala County, Texas